Belfield is a city in Stark County, North Dakota, United States and only 15 minutes from Theodore Roosevelt National Park. Belfield's population was 996 at the 2020 census. Belfield was founded in 1883, and has seen many boom and busts in this oil-rich part of North Dakota. It is part of the Dickinson Micropolitan Statistical Area.

Geography

Climate

Demographics

2010 census
As of the census of 2010, there were 800 people, 360 households, and 225 families residing in the city. The racial makeup of the city was 97.3% White, 0.9% Native American, 0.9% Asian, 0.6% from other races, and 0.4% from two or more races. Hispanic or Latino of any race were 1.9% of the population.

There were 360 households, of which 29.4% had children under the age of 18 living with them, 45.0% were married couples living together, 12.2% had a female householder with no husband present, 5.3% had a male householder with no wife present, and 37.5% were non-families. 32.2% of all households were made up of individuals, and 10% had someone living alone who was 65 years of age or older. The average household size was 2.22 and the average family size was 2.78.

The median age in the city was 42.4 years. 22.2% of residents were under the age of 18; 8.1% were between the ages of 18 and 24; 23.9% were from 25 to 44; 29.7% were from 45 to 64; and 16.4% were 65 years of age or older. The gender makeup of the city was 50.8% male and 49.3% female.

2000 census
As of the census of 2000, there were 866 people, 355 households, and 235 families residing in the city. The population density was 799.8 people per square mile (309.6/km2). There were 439 housing units at an average density of 405.4 per square mile (156.9/km2). The racial makeup of the city was 97.69% White, 0.23% African American, 0.23% Native American, 0.23% Asian, and 1.62% from two or more races. Hispanic or Latino of any race were 1.39% of the population. The top two ancestry groups in the city were German (57.1%) and Ukrainian (17.0%) of the population.

There were 355 households, out of which 34.1% had children under the age of 18 living with them, 52.1% were married couples living together, 9.9% had a female householder with no husband present, and 33.8% were non-families. 31.8% of all households were made up of individuals, and 14.1% had someone living alone who was 65 years of age or older. The average household size was 2.44 and the average family size was 3.09.

In the city, the population was spread out, with 27.6% under the age of 18, 6.5% from 18 to 24, 28.6% from 25 to 44, 20.6% from 45 to 64, and 16.7% who were 65 years of age or older. The median age was 38 years. For every 100 females, there were 104.2 males. For every 100 females age 18 and over, there were 95.3 males.

The median income for a household in the city was $27,619, and the median income for a family was $31,167. Males had a median income of $26,146 versus $14,609 for females. The per capita income for the city was $12,478. About 16.7% of families and 18.6% of the population were below the poverty line, including 24.5% of those under age 18 and 10.3% of those age 65 or over.

Economy

Belfield is located at the junction of two major thoroughfares: I-94 and U.S. Route 85. It is becoming greatly affected by the thriving oil activity in the area. The city has numerous businesses, including the Trapper's Kettle Restaurant and Motel, The Cowboy Inn, Cenex/Superpumper, Dan's Conoco Station, The Roughrider Bar and Steakhouse, Belfield Laundromat, Loved N Hated Tattoo and several others.

References

Cities in North Dakota
Cities in Stark County, North Dakota
Populated places established in 1883
Dickinson, North Dakota micropolitan area
1883 establishments in Dakota Territory
Ukrainian communities in the United States